La Ravoire (Arpitan: La Rovouère or La Ravouère) is a commune in the Savoie department in the Auvergne-Rhône-Alpes region in Southeastern France. In 2019, it had a population of 8,530. It is part of Grand Chambéry.

Population

Twin towns
 Teningen, Germany, since 1984
 Vado Ligure, Italy, since 2002

See also
Communes of the Savoie department

References

External links

Official site

Communes of Savoie